Nowa Wieś  is a village in the administrative district of Gmina Przemęt, within Wolsztyn County, Greater Poland Voivodeship, in west-central Poland.

The village has an approximate population of 750.

References

Villages in Wolsztyn County